Bratton is a settlement in the English county of Shropshire, originally a rural village, now partly suburban. The population in 2011 was 230.

Geography

The countryside around Bratton is largely  flat lowland, but to the south there are hills, the highest point within sight being the Wrekin, which stands on the horizon some four miles to the south. The nearest towns are Wellington and Telford, which lie to the southeast and are the source of most urban services.

Local services
Almost all local government services in Bratton are provided by the Telford and Wrekin unitary authority. 

Bratton has a school, the St Peter’s Church of England Primary School.

Climate
The average temperature in the area is 8° C. In July, the warmest month, the average is 18° C, and in December this falls to 0° C.

Notes

See also
RAF Bratton
Villages in Shropshire
Telford and Wrekin